An engineering society is a professional organization for engineers of various disciplines. Some are umbrella type organizations which accept many different disciplines, while others are discipline-specific. Many award professional designations, such as European Engineer, professional engineer, chartered engineer, incorporated engineer or similar. There are also many student-run engineering societies, commonly at universities or technical colleges.

Africa

Ghana
Ghana Institution of Engineers

South Africa
South African Institute of Electrical Engineers
Engineering Council of South Africa

Zimbabwe
Zimbabwe Institution of Engineers

Americas

Canada
In Canada, the term "engineering society" sometimes refers to organizations of engineering students as opposed to professional societies of engineers. The Canadian Federation of Engineering Students, whose membership consists of most of the engineering student societies from across Canada (see below), is the national association of undergraduate engineering student societies in Canada.

Canada also has many traditions related to the calling of an engineer.

The Engineering Institute of Canada (French: l'Institut Canadien des ingénieurs) has the following member societies:

Institution of Mechanical Engineers (Canadian Branch of the IMechE)
Canadian Maritime Section of the Marine Technology Society
Canadian Nuclear Society
Canadian Society for Chemical Engineering
Canadian Society for Civil Engineering

Ontario
Professional Engineers Ontario 
Engineering Society of Queen's University
Lassonde Engineering Society

United States
Alpha Omega Epsilon
Alpha Pi Mu
American Academy of Environmental Engineers
American Association of Engineering Societies
American Indian Council of Architects and Engineers
American Indian Science and Engineering Society
American Institute of Aeronautics and Astronautics
American Institute of Chemical Engineers
American Nuclear Society
American Railway Engineering Association
American Society for Engineering Education
American Society for Engineering Management
American Society of Agricultural and Biological Engineers
American Society of Civil Engineers
American Society of Heating, Refrigerating and Air-Conditioning Engineers
American Society of Mechanical Engineers
American Society of Naval Engineers
American Society of Plumbing Engineers
American Society of Safety Engineers
American Society for Nondestructive Testing
American Welding Society
Architectural Engineering Institute
ASM International
Association for the Advancement of Cost Engineering
Association for Computing Machinery
Audio Engineering Society
Biomedical Engineering Society
Chi Epsilon
Engineering Society of Buffalo
Eta Kappa Nu
Institute of Biological Engineering
Institute of Electrical and Electronics Engineers
Institute of Industrial and Systems Engineers
Institute of Transportation Engineers
National Academy of Engineering
National Society of Black Engineers
National Society of Professional Engineers
Order of the Engineer
Phi Sigma Rho
Pi Tau Sigma
Society for the Advancement of Material and Process Engineering
Society of American Military Engineers
Society of Automotive Engineers
Society of Broadcast Engineers
Society of Fire Protection Engineers
Society of Hispanic Professional Engineers
Society of Manufacturing Engineers
Society of Naval Architects and Marine Engineers
Society of Petroleum Engineers
Society of Plastics Engineers
Society of Women Engineers
Tau Beta Pi
Theta Tau
Tire Society
Vertical Flight Society

Asia

Association of Southeast Asian Nations
ASEAN Academy of Engineering and Technology

Azerbaijan
Caspian Engineers Society

Bangladesh
Bangladesh Computer Society
Institution of Engineers, Bangladesh
Professional Engineers of Bangladesh

China
Chinese Academy of Engineering
Chinese Academy of Sciences
China Association for Science and Technology
Chinese Society for Electrical Engineering

Hong Kong
Hong Kong Institution of Engineers
International Association of Engineers

India
Aeronautical Society of India
Computer Society of India
Engineering Council of India 
Indian Institute of Chemical Engineers
Indian Institution of Industrial Engineering
Indian Society for Technical Education
Indian Science Congress Association
Institution of Electronics and Telecommunication Engineers
Institution of Engineers (India)
Institution of Mechanical Engineers (India)
Society of EMC Engineers (India)

Japan
Japan Society of Civil Engineers
Union of Japanese Scientists and Engineers

Jordan
Jordanian Engineers Association

Malaysia
Board of Engineers Malaysia

Pakistan
National Technology Council (Pakistan)
Pakistan Engineering Council

Philippines
In the Philippines, the Professional Regulation Commission is a three-man commission attached to the office of the president of the Philippines. Its mandate is to regulate and supervise the practice of professionals (except lawyers) who constitute the highly skilled manpower of the country. As the agency-in-charge of the professional sector, the PRC plays a strategic role in developing the corps of professionals for industry, commerce, governance and the economy.

Associations Accredited by the Professional Regulation Commission
Institute of Electronics Engineers of the Philippines
Philippine Institute of Civil Engineers
Society of Naval Architects and Marine Engineers

Saudi Arabia
Saudi Council of Engineers

Sri Lanka
Institution of Engineers, Sri Lanka
Institution of Incorporated Engineers, Sri Lanka

Europe
European Association for Structural Dynamics
European Federation of National Engineering Associations
European Society for Engineering Education

Azerbaijan
Caspian Engineers Society

France
Association Française de Mécanique

Germany
Verein Deutscher Ingenieure

Greece
Technical Chamber of Greece (Τεχνικό Επιμελητήριο Ελλάδας)

Ireland
Institution of Engineers of Ireland
Institute of Physics and Engineering in Medicine

Portugal
Ordem dos Engenheiros

Romania
General Association of Engineers of Romania

Russia
Russian Union of Engineers

Turkey
Chamber of Computer Engineers of Turkey
Chamber of Electrical Engineers of Turkey
Union of chambers of Turkish engineers and architects

United Kingdom
In the United Kingdom, the Engineering Council is the regulatory body for the engineering profession. The Engineering Council was incorporated by Royal charter in 1981 and controls the award of chartered engineer, incorporated engineer, engineering technician, and information and communications technology technician titles, through licences issued to thirty six recognised Institutions. There are also 19 professional affiliate institutions, not licensed, but with close associations to the Engineering Council.

The Royal Academy of Engineering is the national academy for engineering.

Professional institutions licensed by the Engineering Council
British Computer Society
British Institute of Non-Destructive Testing
Chartered Association of Building Engineers
Chartered Institute of Plumbing and Heating Engineering
Chartered Institution of Building Services Engineers
Chartered Institution of Highways and Transportation
Chartered Institution of Water and Environmental Management
Energy Institute
Institute of Acoustics
Institute of Cast Metals Engineers
Institute of Healthcare Engineering and Estate Management
Institute of Highway Engineers
Institute of Marine Engineering, Science and Technology 
Institute of Materials, Minerals and Mining
Institute of Measurement and Control
Institute of Physics
Institute of Physics and Engineering in Medicine
Institution of Agricultural Engineers
Institution of Chemical Engineers
Institution of Civil Engineers
Institution of Diesel and Gas Turbine Engineers
Institution of Engineering Designers
Institution of Engineering and Technology
Institution of Fire Engineers
Institution of Mechanical Engineers
Institution of Railway Signal Engineers
Institution of Structural Engineers
Nuclear Institute 
Royal Aeronautical Society
Royal Engineers
Royal Institution of Naval Architects
Society of Environmental Engineers
Society of Operations Engineers
The Welding Institute

Professional affiliate bodies of the Engineering Council
Association for Project Management
Chartered Association of Building Engineers
Chartered Institution of Civil Engineering Surveyors
Chartered Quality Institute
Institute of Mathematics and its Applications
Institute of Nanotechnology
International Council on Systems Engineering (UK Chapter)

Professional engineering bodies not affiliated to the Engineering Council
Cleveland Institution of Engineers
Institution of Engineers and Shipbuilders in Scotland
Institute of the Motor Industry
Society of Professional Engineers UK
Women's Engineering Society

Former bodies merged or defunct
Institution of Electrical Engineers
Institution of Incorporated Engineers
Institution of Nuclear Engineers
Society of Engineers UK

Oceania

Australia
Association of Professional Engineers, Scientists and Managers, Australia
Engineers Australia

New Zealand
Institution of Professional Engineers New Zealand
New Zealand Computer Society
University of Canterbury Engineering Society

International
Audio Engineering Society
International Association of Engineers
International Council of Academies of Engineering and Technological Sciences
International Council on Systems Engineering
International Geodetic Student Organisation
International Society of Automation
International Society for Optical Engineering
Institute of Electrical and Electronics Engineers
National Society of Black Engineers
Society of Automotive Engineers
Society of Petroleum Engineers
Society of Professional Engineers UK
Society of Women Engineers
World Federation of Engineering Organizations

See also
Engineer
Engineering
Fields of engineering
Learned society
Standards organization
The Ritual of the Calling of an Engineer

References

Lists of professional associations
Engineering societies
Engineering-related lists